National Highway 507  (NH 507) starts from Herbertpur and ends at Barkot, both places in the state of Uttarakhand. It is a secondary route of National Highway 7. NH-507 runs entirely in the state of Uttarakhand in India. Before renumbering of Indian national highways, it was numbered as NH 123.

Route
NH507 connects Herbertpur, Vikasnagar, Kalsi and Barkot in the state of Uttarakhand in India.

Junctions  
 
  Terminal near Herbertpur.
  near Yamuna Bridge
  Terminal near Barkot.

See also
 List of National Highways in India
 List of National Highways in India by state
 National Highways Development Project

References

External links
 NH 507 on OpenStreetMap

National highways in India
507|507